Rudy Haddad (born 5 February 1985) is a former professional footballer who played as an attacking midfielder.

Career
Haddad is Jewish, and was born in Paris and raised in France to a family of Tunisian Jewish descent. He is a previously highly touted young player, having come up through the youth system at Paris Saint-Germain. On 21 January 2009, he was loaned out to Valenciennes FC.

He was unable to hold down a regular first team place at Paris Saint-Germain. He has been noted as a player of some promise but the presence of Portuguese goalscorer Pauleta restricted his first team opportunities. He signed with Maccabi Tel Aviv in July 2007. His Jewish ethnicity made him a prime target for some football clubs in Israel, where he would not count as a foreigner. Maccabi Tel Aviv placed a €500,000 bid for his services.

On 16 June 2011, Haddad signed a three-year contract with Ligue 1 side AJ Auxerre after a three-year stint with LB Châteauroux in Ligue 2.

In August 2015, Hadad signed a two-year contract with Hapoel Ashkelon from Liga Leumit. In the end of the 2015–16 Hadad was one of the key players of Ashkelon's promotion to the Israeli Premier League.

See also
List of select Jewish football (association; soccer) players

Footnotes

External links

haaretz.com

1985 births
Living people
Association football midfielders
Israeli footballers
Jewish French sportspeople
Jewish Israeli sportspeople
Jewish footballers
French footballers
Paris Saint-Germain F.C. players
Valenciennes FC players
LB Châteauroux players
Maccabi Tel Aviv F.C. players
AJ Auxerre players
Hapoel Ashkelon F.C. players
French emigrants to Israel
Israeli people of Tunisian-Jewish descent
French people of Tunisian-Jewish descent
INF Clairefontaine players
Ligue 1 players
Ligue 2 players
Israeli Premier League players
Liga Leumit players
France under-21 international footballers
Footballers from Paris